Marovo is an Austronesian language of the Solomon Islands. It is spoken in the New Georgia Group on islands in Marovo Lagoon and on the neighbouring islands of New Georgia, Vangunu and Nggatokae. The usual word order in sentences is verb–subject–object.

Names for local fauna are similar to but still much distinct from those in Roviana (and presumably other New Georgia languages).

Footnotes

References

External links 
 Materials on Marovo are included in the open access Arthur Capell collections (AC1 and AC2) held by Paradisec

Languages of the Solomon Islands
Northwest Solomonic languages